Di people may refer to:

Di (狄), also called Beidi (北狄) or Northern Di, several Zhou Dynasty ethnic groups living in northern China
Di (Five Barbarians) (氐), one of the Five Barbarians of the Sixteen Kingdoms period.